Saoud bin Abdulrahman Al Thani (born 19 February 1970) is the Chief of the Amiri Diwan of the State of Qatar.

He is a senior government official, and former Secretary General of the Qatar Olympic Committee.  He also served as Qatar’s Ambassador to the Federal Republic of Germany.

Biography

Born in Doha, he completed an undergraduate degree in electrical engineering at New Mexico State University in 1993 before going on to gain a Master's Degree in Sports Management from the University of Lyon. He served in the Qatar Armed Forces before becoming involved in national level sports administration positions.

His first major organizational projects came as Director General of the committees for the 2004 Gulf Cup of Nations and the 2005 West Asian Games, as well as being a committee member for the 2006 Asian Games. He served as the Secretary General of the Qatar Olympic Committee, President of the Qatar Basketball Federation and Vice-President of the International Fencing Federation (FIE). 

Sheikh Saoud played a major role in the winning of bids for Qatar's first international level sports competitions including the 2014 FINA World Swimming Championships (25 m), the 2015 World Men's Handball Championship, 2016 UCI Road World Championships, 2018 Artistic Gymnastics World Championships and the 2019 World Championships in Athletics (being the bid leader for the latter). These projects formed part of the Qatar National Vision 2030, a long-term government plan to develop the nation's economic and cultural wealth.

He also promotes the participation of Qatari women in sports, noting the increased investment in women's sports in the country and participation of its female athletes at the 2011 Pan Arab Games and 2012 London Olympics.

He is a sport’s enthusiast and is particularly interested in tennis, shooting sports, soccer and swimming.

He Served as Secretary General of the Qatar Olympic Committee from 2002 – 2015..

In 2017, he was appointed Ambassador of the State of Qatar to the Federal Republic of Germany and Non-resident Ambassador to the Czech Republic (2017-2019). 

As Ambassador of Qatar to Germany he had many significant achievements, notably the opening of the Arab Cultural House “Al Diwan” in Berlin, a cultural house aimed at strengthening German and Arab cultural relations. The Embassy of the State of Qatar restored and rehabilitated the building to preserve its historical character and transformed it into an Arab cultural house.  "Al Diwan" holds significant importance as the first Qatari cultural center outside the State of Qatar. Its opening marked a new chapter in Qatari-German cultural relations.

In 2020, he was appointed Chief of the Amiri Diwan on October 27, 2020 by the Amiri Order (5) of 2020.

References

External links
Lecture on Olympic values

1970 births
People from Doha
Qatari sports executives and administrators
Saoud Bin Abdulrahman
Qatari military personnel
Living people